Sikh architecture is a style of architecture that was developed under the Sikh Confederacy and Sikh Empire during the 18th and 19th centuries in the Punjab region. Due to its progressive style, it is constantly evolving into many newly developing branches with new contemporary styles. Although Sikh architecture was initially developed within Sikhism its style has been used in many non-religious buildings due to its beauty. 300 years ago, Sikh architecture was distinguished for its many curves and straight lines; Shri Keshgarh Sahib and the Sri Harmandir Sahib (Golden Temple) are prime examples.

Background 
Sikh Architecture is heavily influenced by Mughal and Islamic styles. The onion dome, frescoes, in-lay work, and multi-foil arches, are Mughal influences, more specially from Shah Jahan's period, whereas chattris, oriel windows, bracket supported eaves at the string-course, and ornamented friezes are derived from elements of Rajput architecture.

Apart from religious buildings, Sikh architecture includes secular forts, bungas (residential places), palaces, and colleges. The religious structure is called gurdwara (a place where the Guru dwells). The word gurdwara is a compound of guru (guide or master) and dwara (gateway or seat). So, it has an architectural connotation. Sikh gurdwaras are generally commemorative buildings connected with the ten gurus in some way, or with places and events of historical significance. Some examples are Gurdwara Dera Sahib (halting place), in Batala in Gurdaspur district. It was erected in memory of the brief stay of Guru Nanak along with his companions on the occasion of his marriage. Gurdwara Shahid Ganj (Martyr's Memorial) in Muktsar in Faridkot district commemorates the cremation spot of Sikhs who were killed in a battle between Guru Gobind Singh and the Mughals in 1705. Gurdwara Shish Mahal (hall of mirrors) in Kiratpur in Ropar district was made where Guru Har Kisan was born.

There are over 500 historical gurdwaras.

Conservation 
Many priceless Sikh heritage sites (including their architecture) have been destroyed or altered beyond recognition under the guise of "kar seva" renovations by various institutions and groups in recent-times, especially vulnerable are Sikh heritage sites in both India and Pakistan according to one scholar, who states it is due to "...the lack of will on the part of the authorities concerned to preserve them". An example of these haphazard and destructive renovations is an incident involving the top section of the historical Darshani Deori (gateway) at the Gurdwara Tarn Taran Sahib complex, which was demolished by Kar Seva groups in March 2019. Many groups are rushing to digitize what historical architecture and structures remains for posterity before they are lost, such as Panjab Digital Library. In July 2021, the SGPC launched a project to archive and document the heritage structures of the community and have set up the old doors of the Golden Temple as museum display when they were replaced. However, around the same time the SGPC denied the importance of a historical Sikh structure discovered underground near the Golden Temple complex, which experts at the Archaeological Survey of India (ASI) deemed as 'historic'. Also, the SGPC made plans to raze a historical building known as Guru Ram Das Sarai, even in the face of criticism of the decision by experts. As many as ninety percent of Sikh heritage monuments have been destroyed in Punjab in the name of renovation and kar seva.

Gallery

See also 

 Sikh architecture in Karnataka
 Nanak Shahi bricks
 Sikh art and culture
 Sikh scriptures
 History of Sikhism
 Sikh Ajaibghar
 Mehdiana Sahib

References

Arshi, Pardeep Singh, Sikh Architecture in the Punjab, Intellectual Pub. House, 1986.
Brown, Percy, Indian Architecture (Islamic Period), Fifth Edition, 1965, Bombay. 
Brown, Percy, Indian Architecture (Hindu and Buddhist Period), Fifth Edition, 1965, Bombay. 
Singh, Mehar, Sikh Shrines In India, Publications Division, Government of India, 1974, New Delhi. 
Singh, Darshan, The Sikh art and architecture, Dept. of Guru Nanak Sikh Studies, Panjab University, 1987.
Marg, Volume XXX, Number 3, June 1977, Bombay.

Further reading

External links

Article on Sikh Architecture
Article on Sikh Architecture

 
Architectural styles
Indian architectural history
Pakistani architectural history